Bukovica Velika may refer to:

 Bukovica Velika (Derventa), a village in Bosnia and Herzegovina
 Bukovica Velika (Doboj), a village in Bosnia and Herzegovina